The fourth generation iPod Touch (marketed as "the new iPod touch", and colloquially known as the iPod Touch 4G, iPod Touch 4, or iPod 4) is a multi-touch mobile device designed and marketed by Apple Inc. with a touchscreen-based user interface. The successor to the 3rd-generation iPod Touch, it was unveiled at Apple's media event on September 1, 2010, and was released on September 12, 2010. It is compatible with up to iOS 6.1.6, which was released on February 21, 2014. 

The fourth-generation iPod Touch was the first iPod to offer front and rear facing cameras. It is a slimmer, lighter model than its predecessors and the iPhone 4, and introduces a Retina Display. Other improvements include support for recording 720p video via the rear camera, Apple's A4 chip (the same chip used in the iPad (1st generation), and iPhone 4).

History
The fourth-generation iPod Touch was initially released with a single color option. It initially featured with a black-colored front with a stainless steel back. On October 12, 2011, with the release of the iPhone 4S, the white-colored version was added and the stainless steel back remained unchanged. It was the last iPod Touch to have this customization option, because it was removed with the release of the fifth-generation iPod Touch, which removed the front color options in favor of changing the faceplate color depending on the back color of the device.

The device was initially only sold in 8 GB, 32 GB and 64 GB models. The three storage options remained the same in October 2011, with the release of the white-colored version. On October 11, 2012, Apple discontinued the 8 GB and 64 GB models with the release of the 32 and 64 GB models of the fifth-generation iPod Touch. The price for the 32 GB model was reduced, and the 16 GB model was introduced. The iPod Touch (4th generation) was officially discontinued by Apple on May 30, 2013, with the release of a 16 GB version of its successor, the iPod Touch 5. It is also the last of the iPod Touch players released to use the 30-pin dock connector, which was substituted with the Lightning connector starting with the 5th generation of iPod Touch devices.

Features

Software

It fully supports iOS 4, and iOS 5, but has limited support for iOS 6. Unlike the iPhone 4, it did not support iOS 7 due to performance issues. On November 14, 2013, Apple issued iOS 6.1.5 for the iPod touch (4th generation) to fix FaceTime calls failing. On February 21, 2014, Apple issued iOS 6.1.6 for the iPod touch (4th generation) and iPhone 3GS to fix faulty SSL verification. It also was the last version for all those devices.

References 

IPod
IOS
Products introduced in 2010
Touchscreen portable media players
Digital audio players